North Kitsap School District 400 is the school district serving the northern portion of Kitsap County, including the communities of Poulsbo, Keyport, Port Gamble, Hansville, Indianola, Suquamish, and Kingston, Washington.

Poulsbo Schools
Poulsbo is home to a handful of elementary schools, two middle schools, and two high schools.

The elementary schools located in Poulsbo include Pearson Elementary, Poulsbo Elementary and Vinland Elementary. Poulsbo Middle School and North Kitsap High School and Kingston High School.

North Kitsap High School

North Kitsap High School finished undergoing renovations in spring 2009, and now provides students with a beautiful campus that features a brand new cafeteria, repaved walkways, landscaping and decorative touches, trees and other plants, and more. There are currently 74 teachers and three counselors. The school is home to about 1,100 students.

Kingston Schools
Kingston is home to many public schools such as Wolfle Elementary, Gordon Elementary, Kingston Middle School, Kingston High School and Spectrum Community School. These are all a part of North Kitsap School District.

Richard Gordon Elementary
Richard F. Gordon Elementary School is a Kindergarten through 5th grade public school in Kingston, Washington. Richard Gordon Elementary is the location of the regular and two additional programs that students from the North Kitsap School District can attend. The school is named after NASA astronaut Richard F. Gordon, an alumnus of nearby North Kitsap High School, who orbited the Moon in 1969 on Apollo 12.

Options
Options is a parent involved, alternative learning program for grades K-8.  It is currently located at Gordon Elementary. It will move to Wolfle Elementary. There is a large drama component, including multiple student plays each year. The Options program was founded in 1989.

Wolfle Elementary
David H. Wolfle is a Kindergarten through 5th grade public school in Kingston, Washington.

Kingston Middle School
Kingston Middle School is a middle school located in Kingston, Washington. Located on West Kingston Road, the school was established in 1990. The school has sixth, seventh, and eighth grade classes. In 2007, this school was changed from a junior high into a middle school.

Kingston High School

Kingston High School is a public high school in Kingston, Washington. The school opened as the second High school in the North Kitsap School District. The school holds grades 9-12.

Suquamish Schools 
Suquamish is home to one elementary school. Suquamish Elementary is the only school in this region of the North Kitsap School District.

References

External links
http://www.nkschools.org/

School districts in Washington (state)
Education in Kitsap County, Washington